The Suratgarh–Bathinda line or Suratgarh–Shri Ganganagar–Bathinda line is a railway route on the North Western Railway zone and Northern Railway zone of Indian Railways. This route plays an important role in rail transportation of Bikaner division of Rajasthan state and Fazilka district, Sri Muktsar Sahib district and Bathinda district of Punjab.

History

 The first phase, from Suratgarh Junction to Rai Singh Nagar was opened on 1 October 1925.
 The second phase, from Rai Singh Nagar to Kesrisinghpur was opened on 1 September 1927.
 The third phase, from Kesrisinghpur to Shri Ganganagar Junction was opened on 1 May 1926.
 The Fifth phase, from Hindumalkote to Shri Ganganagar Junction was opened on 1970.

Whereas, the branch line from Sarupsar Junction to Anupgarh which comes under the portion of Bikaner State Railway was opened on 30 March 1929.

After that, the conversion of main line into  broad gauge was sanctioned in 1997–98, Which it was important for military purpose because this railway line also passes through nearest of International border of India, was opened in different sections.

 The first phase, between Shri Ganganagar and Sarupsar Junction was opened on 9 June 2012.
 The second phase, between Suratgarh and Anupgarh was opened on 25 July 2013.

Trains Passing through this line
 Kochuveli–Shri Ganganagar Junction Express
 Bikaner–Delhi Sarai Rohilla Superfast Express
 Hazur Sahib Nanded–Shri Ganganagar Weekly Express
 Firozpur Cantonment–Shri Ganganagar Express

References

5 ft 6 in gauge railways in India
Bikaner railway division
Ambala railway division
Rail transport in Rajasthan
Rail transport in Punjab, India